The Muraenesocidae, or pike congers, are a small family of marine eels found worldwide in tropical and subtropical seas. Some species are known to enter brackish water.

Pike congers have cylindrical bodies, scaleless skin, narrow heads with large eyes, and strong teeth. Their dorsal fins start above the well-developed pectoral fins.

Genera
About 15 known species are recognized in 6 genera:
 Genus Congresox
 Genus Cynoponticus
 Genus Gavialiceps
 Genus Muraenesox
 Genus Oxyconger
 Genus Sauromuraenesox

References

A Dictionary of Zoology 1999, originally published by Oxford University Press 1999.

 
Marine fish families
Eels
Ray-finned fish families